The Tricity Ring Road (Polish: 
Obwodnica trójmiejska, Obwodnica Trójmiasta, Trasa Obwodowa Trójmiasta) is a ring road in Poland bypassing the metropolitan area formed by the cities of Gdynia, Sopot and Gdańsk commonly known as the Tricity. It forms a part of the S6 expressway which will eventually run from Szczecin to Gdańsk. It is also part of the European route E28.

History 
Construction started in the 1970s and the first section was opened for use in 1977. Due to a lack of funds during the 1980s, construction was delayed many times. The fall of communism in 1990 also slowed down construction. Major sections of the beltway were completed in 2001 with the last two major junctions finished in 2008.

The various stages were constructed in the following years:
1973-1977: northbound lanes Gdynia – Pruszcz Gdański
1978-1984: southbound lanes Gdynia – Straszyn
1987-1989: Kowale Junction
1994-1996: Wysoka Junction
2000-2001: southbound lanes Straszyn – Juszkowo
2002-2003: road maintenance and resurfacing
2006-2007: connection to the A1 motorway
2006-2008: junction with Trasa Kwiatkowskiego

Transport infrastructure 

The beltway is an important piece of infrastructure in the Pomeranian Voivodeship easing congestion through the center of the Tricity area and diverting transit traffic. The beltway also connects the Gdańsk Lech Wałęsa Airport with the rest of the Voivodeship.

The Tricity Ring Road was one of the first orbital, beltway and ring roads that bypass major cities in Poland.

Current development 
A junction connecting the south end of the Tricity Beltway to the A1 motorway has been completed by 22 December 2007 enabling travel first up to Grudziądz and, as the A1 was completed, through Toruń, Łódź and Katowice, to the Czech border in the south.

On the 12 June 2008, Trasa im. Eugeniusza Kwiatkowskiego was completed and finally connected the Port of Gdynia to the beltway, bypassing the local city streets. This reduced truck traffic in residential areas greatly since all heavy trucks heading towards the port used National road 6, which at the time went through the center of the city.

In 2012 a 18 km stretch of the S7 expressway was opened in Gdańsk, extending from the S6 eastward, forming the southern bypass of Gdańsk.

A new beltway called the Tricity Metropolitan Ring Road is being planned further out, after multiple delays scheduled for 2025, and the route of the S6 expressway is to be moved there once it is opened.

External links 
Satellite pictures of the Gdańsk Matarnia junction using maps.google.com
Website about new roads in Pomeranian Voivodship (in Polish)
GDDKIA Website (in Polish and English)
Traffic Cameras from the beltway as well as other major roads in Poland (in Polish)

Roads in Poland
Buildings and structures in Pomeranian Voivodeship